Khalid Jamai (also written Jamaï or Jamii) (1944 – 1 June 2021) was a Moroccan journalist, writer, and political analyst. He was the editor-in-chief of the Moroccan Francophone newspaper L'Opinion, and a leading member of the Istiqlal Party. Jamai was recognized for his distinguished writing style and audacious political positions.

In 1973, Jamai was imprisoned for his outspoken opinions as a journalist. While in prison, he interviewed inmates and documented their personal stories and their views on the policing and political structure of Morocco. After his release, he published these stories in his book, “Presumed Guilty”. 

Khalid Jamai was the father of the journalist and banker Aboubakr Jamaï.

He died on 1 June 2021 at the age of 77.

References

1944 births
2021 deaths
Moroccan male journalists
Moroccan editors
Moroccan activists
Istiqlal Party politicians
People from Fez, Morocco
20th-century Moroccan people
21st-century Moroccan people